St. Barbe Bay is a natural bay off the island of Newfoundland in the province of Newfoundland and Labrador, Canada.

See also

Related articles
 Kys, Newfoundland and Labrador
 Blanc-Sablon, Quebec
 Strait of Belle Isle
 Newfoundland and Labrador, province
 Newfoundland Island

References

Bays of Newfoundland and Labrador